Leo Meyer (1873-1964) was a politician in Texas and Oklahoma and was the first Jew elected to statewide public office in Oklahoma.

Early years
Meyer was born in New York City to recent German immigrant parents. After attending high school in Brooklyn, New York, he moved to Texas at age 16, where he eventually went into the mercantile and cotton business in Bellville, Texas in 1890. In 1895 he married Margaret Lewis of Nelsonville, Texas and was becoming active in local politics in Bellville, eventually being elected as mayor.

Oklahoma years
The 1900 Galveston hurricane destroyed his family's business, so Meyer and his family moved to Sayre, Oklahoma where he worked as the manager of the Dixie Dry Goods store. He also continued his work in Democratic party politics serving on the town's first board of trustees before being elected as the town's first mayor in 1905, an office he held until 1906.

In 1906, Meyer was attended the Oklahoma constitutional convention (contrary to some reports, he was not a delegate) and was a strong supporter of the draft constitution's progressive and populist agenda, which may have influenced William Cross (the first Oklahoma Secretary of State) to choose Meyer as Oklahoma's first Assistant Secretary of State.

In 1907, the Meyer family moved to Guthrie, Oklahoma (the then state capitol), where his family was one of ten families who came together to form Guthrie's first Jewish congregation.

The most notable event in Meyer's time in the Oklahoma State department was his role in the transfer of the Oklahoma state capitol from Guthrie to Oklahoma City in 1910, which led the Guthrie Daily Leader newspaper to use extreme anti-semitic language to accuse the Jewish community in Oklahoma City of having inappropriately "stolen" the state capitol from Guthrie, which led to significant media attention including the forceful assertion by Rabbi Joseph Blatt of Oklahoma City that the newspaper's claims were slanderous and that they were a “a disgrace to the civilization of our state.”

During his time in Oklahoma City, Meyer was an active member of Temple B'nai Israel (Oklahoma City) of Oklahoma City.

In November 1910, Meyer was elected as Oklahoma's second state auditor. His tenure is best remembered for his work in moving the state towards using bonds (rather than warrants) for financing state government, but also for his being accused of financial improprieties by his political opponents. While a county judge found that Meyer had committed no wrong, members of the state legislature continued to press the matter and began impeachment proceedings. Meyer, feeling that he had lost the support of the Democratic party establishment, resigned from office in February 1913.

The Meyer family moved from Oklahoma City to Tulsa in 1916 where Meyer became the tax counsel of the Mid-continent Petroleum Company. In Tulsa, Meyer was deeply involved in the community of Temple Israel (Tulsa, Oklahoma) (a Reform Jewish synagogue), including being elected as Temple President in 1924.

Meyer died in Tulsa in 1964.

References

1873 births
1964 deaths
American people of German-Jewish descent
Oklahoma Democrats
Politicians from Tulsa, Oklahoma
Jewish American people in Oklahoma politics
Jewish American politicians